The men's triple jump event  at the 1987 IAAF World Indoor Championships was held at the Hoosier Dome in Indianapolis on 6 and 8 March.

Medalists

Results

Qualification
Qualification: 16.70 m (Q) or at least 12 best performers (q).

Final

References

Triple jump
Triple jump at the World Athletics Indoor Championships